Jeunesse Sportive d'El Menzah, commonly known as JS Menzah or JSM, is a Tunisian basketball club based in the El Menzah suburbs, in Tunis. Established in 1997, the team plays in the Championnat National A.

The team plays in the Palais des sports d'El Menzah, which has a capacity for 4,500 people. In 2017, JSM participated in the Arab Nations Basketball Championship.

References

External links
Facebook page

Basketball teams in Tunisia
Sport in Tunis
Basketball teams established in 1997